Our World War is a 2014 British television drama mini-series based on first hand accounts of the soldiers who served in the First World War and how it affected people on the battlefield. The show was created by Joe Barton and directed by Bruce Goodison and Ben Chanan and was inspired by the 2012 BAFTA-winning series Our War. Episodes first aired on BBC Three on 7 August 2014 and concluded on 21 August, the release show was released as part of the 100 year commemoration of the beginning of the First World War. 

The series featured three hour-long episodes featuring different accounts and stories and starring a new cast per each episode. The series starred such actors as Luke Tittensor, Jefferson Hall, Gerard Kearns, Michael Socha, Danny Walters, Dominic Thorburn and Theo Barklem-Biggs.

Production
The series makes use of modern film techniques like fixed, body-mounted cameras and overhead battle scene animations, alongside a modern soundtrack featuring artists such as PJ Harvey, to attract a new audience. Parts of episode one were filmed at The Historic Dockyard in Chatham, Kent which doubled as the British HQ in Mons.

Cast

The First Day

Pals

War Machine

Episode list

Reception
While some reviewers described the soundtrack choice as "powerful" and "beautiful", others felt it trivialised the subject matter and would quickly date.

References

External links

2014 British television series debuts
2014 British television series endings
2010s British drama television series
BBC television dramas
2010s British television miniseries
World War I television drama series
English-language television shows